Al-Masriyah is a village in central Syria, administratively part of the Homs Governorate, located southwest of Homs and immediately north and south of the border with Lebanon. Nearby localities include Zita al-Gharbiyah to the north, al-Qusayr to the northeast, Zira'a and Rablah. According to the Central Bureau of Statistics (CBS), Al-Masriyah had a population of 618 in the 2004 census. Its inhabitants are predominantly Shia Muslims.

References

Populated places in al-Qusayr District
Shia Muslim communities in Syria